This is a list of the queens consort and kings consort of the Kingdom of Castile, and later, Crown of Castile.

It is, in part, a continuation of the list of Asturian royal consorts and the  list of Leonese royal consorts.

Countesses

Banu Mamaduna

Banu Ansúrez

Banu Mamaduna

Queens and Kings

House of Jiménez

House of Ivrea

House of Trastámara

House of Habsburg

At 1556, the union of the Spanish kingdoms is generally called Spain and Mary I of England (second wife of Philip II) is listed as the first Queen consort of Spain.

See also
List of Castilian monarchs
List of Aragonese consorts
List of Asturian consorts
List of Galician consorts
List of Hispanic consorts
List of Leonese consorts
List of Navarrese consorts
List of Spanish consorts

Notes

Sources

 
Castilian Queen Consorts, List of
Castile
Castille